The DeSoto Falls of Georgia are located in Lumpkin County, Georgia along Frogtown Creek. There are actually three waterfalls on Frogtown Creek, called Upper DeSoto Falls, Middle Desoto Falls and Lower DeSoto Falls. The upper waterfall drops , the middle waterfall drops  and the lower waterfall drops .

The DeSoto Falls are named for Spanish explorer Hernando deSoto, who passed through Georgia around 1540.

The falls are part of the Chattahoochee National Forest and located in a  area designated the Desoto Falls Scenic Area.  There is also a campground located along the banks of Frogtown Creek.  DeSoto Falls is one of four popular waterfalls in the Forest located near Helen, Georgia.  The other three popular waterfalls are Anna Ruby Falls, Dukes Creek Falls and Raven Cliff Falls, all located in neighboring White County.

References

External links
Desoto Falls Trail: Hiking Waterfalls near Helen (atlantatrails.com trail review)
Profile on GeorgiaTrails.com
Profile on GORP
TopoQuest Map of DeSoto Falls
DeSoto Falls Hiking Trail Profile on secretfalls.com

Waterfalls of Georgia (U.S. state)
Protected areas of Lumpkin County, Georgia
Landforms of Lumpkin County, Georgia